Space Age 1.0 is a compilation album by Tiësto and the first in the Space Age releases.

Track listing

Credits
 Artwork By Design and Concept By - Arny Bink
 DJ Mix Compiled By - Tiësto
 Mastered By - Barney Broomer

References

1998 compilation albums
Black Hole Recordings albums
Tiësto compilation albums